Dozi is a town in the Dey Chopan District of Zabul Province, Afghanistan.

See also
 Zabul Province

Populated places in Zabul Province